Stig Engström (born 14 January 1942) is a Swedish actor. He has appeared in more than 60 films and television shows since 1968.

Selected filmography
 Badarna (1968)
 Georgia, Georgia (1972)
 I Am Maria (1979)
 Göta kanal eller Vem drog ur proppen? (1981)
 Mio in the Land of Faraway (1987)
 The Police Murderer (1994)
 Drowning Ghost (2004)
 Behind Blue Skies (2010)

References

External links

1942 births
Living people
20th-century Swedish male actors
21st-century Swedish male actors
Swedish male film actors
Swedish male television actors
Male actors from Stockholm